Zinc mining is the process by which mineral forms of the metal zinc are extracted from the earth through mining. A zinc mine is a mine that produces zinc minerals in ore as its primary product. Common co-products in zinc ores include minerals of lead and silver. Other mines may produce zinc minerals as a by-product of the production of ores containing more valuable minerals or metals, such as gold, silver or copper. Mined ore is processed, usually on site, to produce one or more metal-rich concentrates, then transported to a zinc smelter for production of zinc metal.

Global zinc mine production in 2020 was estimated to be 12 million tonnes. The largest producers were China (35%), Australia (12%), Peru (10%), India (6.0%), United States (5.6%) and Mexico (5.0%), with Australia having the largest reserves.

The world's largest zinc mine is the Red Dog open-pit zinc-lead-silver mine in Alaska, with 4.2% of world production. Major zinc mine operators include Vedanta Resources, Glencore, BHP, Teck Resources, Sumitomo, Nexa Resources, Boliden AB, and China Minmetals.

History 
Zinc deposits have been exploited for thousands of years, with the oldest zinc mine, located in Rajasthan, India established nearly 2000 years BP.

Pure zinc production occurred in the 9th century AD while, earlier in antiquity zinc was primarily utilized in the alloying of copper to produce brass. This is because the isolation of zinc metal from its ore poses a unique challenge. At the temperature zinc is released from its ore it also vaporizes into a gas, and if the furnace is not airtight, the gaseous zinc reacts with the air to form zinc oxide.

Metallic zinc smelting occurred in 9th century BC in India, followed soon by China 300 years later, and In Europe by 1738 AD. The methods of smelting in China and India were most likely independently developed, while the method of smelting developed in Europe was likely derived by the Indian method.

The primary modern use for zinc is for coating iron and steel in order to prevent its corrosion, with nearly half of worldwide zinc production going towards that purpose. Approximately 20% of the world's zinc is used in the production of brass, where zinc is alloyed with copper in between ratios of 20-40% zinc. Of the remaining 30% of the global production of zinc, half is used in the production of zinc alloys, where zinc is combined with varying amounts of aluminium, and magnesium. The remaining zinc is used in various other industries from agriculture as a fertilizer and human consumption as a supplement.

Methods of extraction 
Zinc is mined both at the surface and at depth. Surface mining of zinc, typically used for oxide ores, while underground mining yields zinc sulfide ores. Some of the common methods of zinc mining are open pit mining, open stope, and cut and fill mining:

Open-pit mining: Surface mining involves the removal of waste rock from above an ore deposit before it can be extracted. Once the waste overburden is removed, ore and waste are then mined in parallel, primarily using track-mounted excavators and rubber-tired trucks. In smaller scale operations, front loaders may be used.

Open Stope mining: This is a method of underground mining where ore bodies are completely removed leaving sizeable caverns (stopes) within the mine. Open stope mining leaves these caverns with no additional bracing or external support, instead the cavern walls are supported by random pillars of ore which have not been removed.

Cut and Fill stoping: A method of underground mining which removes ore from below the deposit. The stope is then filled with waste rock to replace the mined out ore to support the stope walls, and to provide an elevated floor for the miners and equipment to further extract ore from the deposit.

Production 

Global mine production of zinc in 2019 was 12.9 million tonnes, a 0.9% increase from 2018, with the increase primarily attributed to increased output from zinc mines located in Australia and South Africa. In 2020 production of zinc is expected to rise 3.7% to 13.99 million tonnes, with the increase due to increased production of zinc by China and India.

In 2019 global demand for refined zinc exceeded supply and resulted in a deficit of 0.178 million tonnes, while in 2020 there is an expected surplus of 0.192 million tonnes.

Major zinc producing countries ranked by their output for 2019 are as follows:

Environmental impact 
Research conducted in the health of the benthic macroinvertebrate populations in the mining areas of southeastern Missouri, a US state, have yielded a wealth of information on the effect of zinc mining and its effect on its local environment. Fish and Crayfish populations in localities near mining sites have been observed to be much lower than other populations found in reference sites; with the crayfish possessing metal concentrations within their tissues at a much greater concentration than their reference counterparts. Other investigation into the effect of the health of mussel populations that reside near lead-zinc mining areas have found that the populations residing near mining areas possessed reduced biomass, and were less specious than those found in their reference sites. Plant tissue have been reported to possess concentrations of metals 10-60% higher than reference. Macroinvertebrate assessments of localities immediately downstream of mining activity have observed a reduction in biotic condition 10-58% and with the ecosystem having an impaired ability to support its populations when compared to other reference sites.

Benthic macro-invertebrates such as crayfish and mussels represent a pathway for biomagnification, where the concentration of noxious materials within organisms at higher trophic levels accumulates as a result of consuming contaminated prey. In addition, benthic macroinvertebrate populations are frequently used as indicators of overall ecosystem health.

Assessment of soil samples from agricultural areas near a lead-zinc mining region in Guangxi, China have observed a "Serious pollution level" of zinc in the soils of the paddy fields relatively close to the mining area and a "Moderate pollution level" in the aerated fields relatively further away. The research also indicated that as a result of their Nemerow synthetic index assessment, the region under study is not fit for agricultural purposes. Other investigation into the effect of zinc mining on agricultural soils in the Heilongjiang Province of China has found that the soils were "moderately contaminated" and a significant reduction in the population and diversity of the bacterial assemblages within the soils and reduced activity of soil enzymes. The activity of the bacteria and enzymes aid plant matter in the uptake of nutrients, decompose decaying matter, and other ecosystem interactions. Their reduction and impaired effectiveness result in poorer agricultural productivity.

Zinc mines
The world's ten largest zinc producing mines (by tonnes of zinc) are:

See also
Zinc mining in the United States

References